The Sanremo Music Festival 1969 was the 19th annual Sanremo Music Festival, held at the Sanremo Casino in Sanremo, province of Imperia between 30 January and 1 February 1969.

The show was presented by Nuccio Costa and Gabriella Farinon.

According to the rules of this edition every song was performed in a double performance by a couple of singers or groups. The winners of the Festival were Bobby Solo and Iva Zanicchi with the song "Zingara".

Participants and results

References 

Sanremo Music Festival by year
1969 in Italian music
1969 music festivals